Walter E. Mooney (June 6, 1925 – March 1, 1990) was a MIT educated engineer, aircraft designer, pilot and model aircraft designer who lived in San Diego, California. He was well known professionally for his full scale aircraft efforts for Convair division of General Dynamics but more popularly known for the many plans and articles published in the magazines Model Airplane News, Boys' Life, and Aero Modeller in the 1960s. He was once featured as a daredevil glider pilot on the 1973 TV series Thrill Seekers. He designed the ROHR Two-175 Experimental Aircraft almost put in production to compete against the Cessna 172 in 1971.

The Flying Aces model club of Washington has held a Walt Mooney Memorial model airplane meet named in his honor.

Examples
 Piper PA 25 Pawnee, with Plan, by Walter Mooney Model Airplane News, December 1965, Vol. 72, No. 6
 List of Mooney Plans
 Walt Mooney on FF - Scale from January 1974 American Aircraft Modeler

References
 The Academy of Model Aeronautics History Program Presents: Biography of WALTER E. MOONEY 1926 to March 1, 1990 (Oral History)
 American Modeler: The Best in Model Planes, Radio Control, Model Boats, 1961, page 61

1925 births
1990 deaths
Model aircraft
20th-century American engineers
Massachusetts Institute of Technology alumni